Edward Moore, FBA (1835–1916) was an English scholar who specialized in Dante Alighieri. He was born at Cardiff, educated at Bromsgrove Grammar School and at Pembroke College, Oxford.

For a time he was rector of Gatcombe, Isle of Wight. From 1862 to 1864 he was fellow and tutor of Queen's College, Oxford. In 1864 he became the principal of St. Edmund Hall, and in 1903 he was made canon of Canterbury Cathedral.

He became an honorary fellow of Pembroke and Queen's colleges (1902), and received the honorary degree  D.Litt. from the University of Dublin.

Moore published:

 Aristotle's Ethics, books i-iv (5th edition, 1896)
 Aristotle's Poetics, with Notes (1875)
 Time References in the Divine Commedia (1887), translated and published at Florence in 1900 with the title Gli accenni al tempo nella Divina Commedia; Textual Criticism of the Divina Commedia
 Dante and his Early Biographers (1890)
 Tutte le opere di Dante Alighieri, the "Oxford Dante".
 Studies in Dante. First Series. Scripture and Classical Authors in Dante (Oxford, 1896)
 Studies in Dante. Second Series. Miscellaneous Essays (Oxford, 1899)
 Studies in Dante. Third Series. Miscellaneous Essays (Oxford, 1903)
 Studies in Dante. Fourth Series. Textual Criticism of the Convivio and Miscellaneous Essays (Oxford, 1917)

References 
 

1838 births
1916 deaths
English translators
Writers from Cardiff
People educated at Bromsgrove School
Dante scholars
Principals of St Edmund Hall, Oxford
Alumni of Pembroke College, Oxford
Fellows of The Queen's College, Oxford
Fellows of Pembroke College, Oxford
Presidents of the Oxford Union